Reverence is the debut album by Faithless, released in April 1996 and then reissued in October. The album contains several singles that have subsequently become Faithless classics, such as "Don't Leave", "Salva Mea", and "Insomnia". The album reached number 26 on the UK Albums Chart.

In 1996, the album was re-released as Reverence / Irreverence containing an extra CD with remixes of the original songs.

Track listing
All songs written by Rollo Armstrong, Sister Bliss and Maxi Jazz, except where noted.

Reverence / Irreverence

Reverence / Irreverence is a re-release of Reverence album, featuring a bonus CD with remixes.

Charts

Certifications

References

Faithless albums
Cheeky Records albums
1996 albums
Albums produced by Rollo Armstrong